František Hrúzik (Czechoslovakia, 1 May 1927 – 9 August 2021) was a Slovak equestrian who competed in the 1960 Summer Olympics for Czechoslovakia.

References

1927 births
2021 deaths
Czechoslovak male equestrians
Olympic equestrians of Czechoslovakia
Equestrians at the 1960 Summer Olympics
People from Nitra District
Sportspeople from the Nitra Region